Oncideres pretiosa is a species of beetle in the family Cerambycidae. It was described by Martins and Galileo in 1990. It is known from French Guiana and Brazil.

References

pretiosa
Beetles described in 1990